István Mészáros (30 April 1933 – 6 May 1994) was a Hungarian sprint canoeist who competed in the mid-1950s. He won two medals at the 1954 ICF Canoe Sprint World Championships in Mâcon with a gold in the K-2 1000 m and a bronze in the K-4 10000 m events.

References

Biography of István Mészáros 

1933 births
1994 deaths
Hungarian male canoeists
ICF Canoe Sprint World Championships medalists in kayak
20th-century Hungarian people